Larijan District is a district (bakhsh) in Amol county, Mazandaran Province, Iran. Its administrative center is Rineh.  At the 2006 census, its population was 8,089, in 2,406 families.  The District has two cities: Rineh and Gazanak.  The District has two rural districts (dehestan): Bala Larijan Rural District and Larijan-e Sofla Rural District.

Tourism
Haraz River
Lar Dam
Mount Damavand
Shahandasht Waterfall
Yakhi Waterfall

References 

Amol County
Districts of Mazandaran Province